Oggiyamduraipakkam is a census town in Chennai district in the Indian state of Tamil Nadu.

Demographics
In the 2001 India census, Oggiyamduraipakkam had a population of 25,961. Males constituted 52% of the population and females 48%. Oggiyamduraipakkam had an average literacy rate of 73%, higher than the national average of 59.5%: male literacy was 78%, and female literacy was 67%. In 2001 in Oggiyamduraipakkam, 12% of the population was under 6 years of age.

In the 2011 census, Oggiyamduraipakkam had a population of 78,515.

References

Cities and towns in Chennai district